Sir Manasseh Masseh Lopes, 1st Baronet (27 January 1755 – 26 March 1831), of Maristow in the parish of Tamerton Foliot, Devon, was a  British Member of Parliament and borough-monger.

Parliamentary career
Born in Jamaica, Lopes was a member of a family of rich Portuguese Sephardic Jews, who allegedly made their fortune as sugar planters and slave-owners in Jamaica before he migrated to Great Britain. In 1798 he acquired Maristow House near Roborough in Devon, as a new family seat. He also had a town house in Fitzroy Square, Westminster. He had also for many years been investing part of his fortune in acquiring influence in a number of parliamentary boroughs.

By the law as it stood at that period, no member of the Jewish religion could be elected to Parliament. (Many Christian denominations were similarly prohibited.) In 1802, Lopes converted to Christianity, and later the same year he entered Parliament as Tory member for New Romney. He subsequently also represented Evesham from 1807 and Barnstaple from 1812. In 1810, he bought control of the pocket borough of Westbury from Montagu Bertie, 5th Earl of Abingdon when the latter sold the manor of Westbury. Westbury was a burgage borough where the right to vote was attached to the ownership of certain properties; Lopes had bought all but two of these "burgage tenements", giving him the absolute power to name both of Westbury's MPs. (Unlike bribery, transactions of this sort were perfectly legal.) Between 1814 and 1819, he gave one of those seats to his nephew and heir, Ralph Franco.

Meanwhile, Lopes was exerting his influence in various boroughs on behalf of the government, and in 1805 he was created a baronet, with a special remainder to his nephew Ralph Franco, son of his sister Esther. (Ralph, who inherited the baronetcy on his death, later changed his surname to Lopes). In 1810 he was appointed High Sheriff of Devon.

In 1819, Sir Manasseh was discovered to have bribed the voters in two separate constituencies at the previous year's general election. Such corruption was common, but reformers were looking for a cause celebre to give prominence to their campaign, and it seems likely that, as a foreign Jew, Lopes was seen as an ideal villain for the purpose. In his own Barnstaple constituency, he was alleged to have spent £3000 on bribing the voters, and after investigation his election was declared void. Meanwhile, at Grampound in Cornwall, although no official protest had been entered against the election result, proceedings had been taken under the criminal law and Lopes was convicted, fined £1000 and jailed for two years. As a result of the scandal, the already notoriously corrupt borough of Grampound was permanently deprived of its right to return MPs. Lopes' sentence was remitted in September 1820, and he put himself into Parliament at Westbury in a by-election in November.

In 1829, the Duke of Wellington's Tory government decided to legislate for Catholic Emancipation, a policy which was heretical to their own Ultra-Tory supporters. The Home Secretary, Robert Peel, whose own Oxford University constituency was one of the greatest strongholds of opponents of Catholic Emancipation, felt compelled to resign and fight a by-election to receive a mandate for his change of policy, and was defeated. To allow Peel to return to the Commons in time to move the bill, Lopes vacated his own seat at Westbury and elected Peel in his place. This provoked considerable hostile comment, not least because the government had responded to the Anglican establishment voting against them by acquiring a seat from a Jewish-born borough owner. Lopes reportedly expected to be rewarded for providing his seat at so vital a moment with a peerage, but he was disappointed.

Although Peel had no need of the seat after the general election which came the following year, Lopes did not stand again.

Death
Sir Manasseh died in 1831 aged 76.  There is a memorial to him by Richard Westmacott in Bickleigh Church.

Arms

Lopes was granted a coat of arms blazoned Azure, a chevron or charged with three bars gemelles gules between three eagles rising of the second on a chief of the second five lozenges of the first.

References

 Concise Dictionary of National Biography. Pt 1: From the beginnings to 1900. London: Oxford U. P., 1906
 Brock, Michael (1973) The Great Reform Act. London: Hutchinson, 1973
 Cannon, John (1973) Parliamentary Reform 1640-1832. Cambridge: Cambridge University Press
 Oldfield, T. H. B. (1816), The Representative History of Great Britain and Ireland. London: Baldwin, Cradock & Joy

External links 

1755 births
1831 deaths
Lopes, Manasseh Masseh, 1st Baronet
Converts to Anglicanism from Judaism
Members of the Parliament of the United Kingdom for Barnstaple
UK MPs 1802–1806
UK MPs 1807–1812
UK MPs 1812–1818
UK MPs 1818–1820
UK MPs 1820–1826
UK MPs 1826–1830
High Sheriffs of Devon
English people of Portuguese-Jewish descent
Jewish British politicians
Tory MPs (pre-1834)
Manasseh
Migrants from British Jamaica to the United Kingdom
People convicted of bribery
Jamaican people of Portuguese descent
English people of Portuguese descent